Rowan or Rawan is a traditionally masculine Irish given name and surname, now also in use as a given name for girls. Variants of the name include Roan, Rohan, Ruadhán, and Ruadh. The name comes from the Irish surname Ó Ruadháin. It is also an Arabic feminine name referring to a river in Paradise. In some instances, the name is given in reference to the tree.

Surname 
 Andrew Summers Rowan (1857–1943), American army officer
 Archibald Hamilton Rowan (1751–1834), Irish celebrity and founding member of The Dublin Society of United Irishmen
 Athol Rowan (1921–1998), South African cricketer
 Barbara Ann Rowan (1938–2020), American attorney
 Carl Rowan (1925–2000), American journalist and author
 Chad Rowan (born 1969), Akebono, Hawaiian sumo wrestler
 Sir Charles Rowan ( – 1852), officer in the British Army and Commissioner of Police of the (London) Metropolis
 Dan Rowan (1922–1987), American actor and comedian, Rowan & Martin's Laugh-In
 Dave Rowan (1882–1955), Canadian baseball player
 Dawn Rowan (born 1946), Australian therapist
 Dominic Rowan (born 1970), English actor
 Ellis Rowan (1847–1922), Australian naturalist and illustrator
 Eric Rowan (1909–1993), South African cricketer
 Erick Rowan (born 1981), ring name of American wrestler Joseph Rudd
 Ev Rowan (1902–1956), American football player
 Ford Rowan, American television reporter, and panelist on Meet the Press
 George Rowan, Scottish footballer
Gordon Lee Rowan, American killed in Algeria in the 2013 In Aménas hostage crisis
 Henry Rowan (1923–2015), American philanthropist and engineer, namesake of Rowan University
 Jenny Rowan (born 1949), New Zealand politician
 John Rowan (disambiguation), several people
 Jonathan Rowan (born 1981), English footballer
 Joseph Rowan (1870–1930), US Representative from New York
 Kelly Rowan (born 1965), Canadian actress and model
 Leslie Rowan (1908–1972), British civil servant and industrialist
 Lou Rowan (born 1925), Australian cricket umpire 
 Louis R. Rowan (1911–1988), American businessman and racehorse owner and breeder
 Matthew Rowan (died 1769), acting governor of North Carolina, 1753–54
 Peter Rowan (born 1942), American bluegrass musician and composer
 Ron Rowan (born 1962), American basketball player
 Sheila Rowan (physicist) (born 1969), British physicist
 Stephen Clegg Rowan (1808–1890), American vice admiral
 William Rowan (1789–1879), British military commander

Given name 
 Saint Rowan, Irish abbot of the 6th century and one of the Apostles of Ireland
 Rowan Alexander, Scottish footballer and manager
 Rowan Atkinson (born 1955), English actor, comedian, and screenwriter
 Rowan Barrett (born 1972), Canadian basketball player in Israeli Basketball Premier League
 Rowan Blanchard (born 2001), American actress
 Rowan Deacon, English director and filmmaker
 Rowan Hisayo Buchanan, American writer
 Rowan Crothers (born 1997), Australian swimmer
 Rowan Cronjé (1937–2014), Rhodesian politician
 Rowan Pelling (born 1968), British editrice and columnist
 Rowan Vine (born 1982), English footballer
 Rowan Williams (born 1950), Archbishop of Canterbury
 William Rowan Hamilton (1805–1865), Irish mathematician

Fictional characters 
 Rowan, one of the two main protagonists in Fire Emblem Warriors
 Rowan, the main character in Emily Rodda's Rowan of Rin fantasy books
 Rowan Damisch, one of the two main characters in the novel Scythe
 Rowan Khanna, in the mobile game Harry Potter: Hogwarts Mystery
 Rowan LaFontaine, in the film Jason X
 Rowan Mayfair, in the Lives of the Mayfair Witches trilogy by Anne Rice
 Rowan Mills, in NBC's The Blacklist
 Rowan Morrison, in 1973 film The Wicker Man

 Rowan North, the main antagonist of the 2016 Ghostbusters reboot
 Rowan Theirin (née Guerrin), in Dragon Age: The Stolen Throne by David Gaider
 Rowan Whitethorn, in the Throne of Glass book series by Sarah J. Maas
 Professor Rowan, in the Pokémon franchise
 Lily Rowan, in the Nero Wolfe franchise by Rex Stout
 Rosalie Rowan, in the DC Animated Universe

References 

English unisex given names
English-language surnames
English-language unisex given names
Given names derived from plants or flowers
Irish unisex given names
Surnames of Irish origin
Feminine given names
Masculine given names